"How Can I Unlove You" is the name of a No. 1 country hit by country music singer Lynn Anderson, released in 1971.  "How Can I Unlove You" was written by Joe South, who had also written "(I Never Promised You a) Rose Garden". The song was produced by Anderson's husband at the time, Glenn Sutton, who had also produced "(I Never Promised You a) Rose Garden".

Chart performance
"How Can I Unlove You", was released as a single in August 1971, shortly after her previous hit, "You're My Man", peaked at No. 1 on the country charts, where it spent three weeks at the top.  Anderson had recently enjoyed what would ultimately be the biggest hit of her career, "(I Never Promised You a) Rose Garden", in February 1971. "How Can I Unlove You" reached No. 63 on the Pop charts, the same position as her previous No. 1 country hit, "You're My Man".

Bluegrass Recording
A Bluegrass version of the song was recorded by Anderson for her Grammy-nominated 2004 album, The Bluegrass Sessions.

References

Lynn Anderson songs
1971 songs
Songs written by Joe South
Columbia Records singles
Song recordings produced by Glenn Sutton